Traditionally, in two-dimensional geometry, a rhomboid is a parallelogram in which adjacent sides are of unequal lengths and angles are non-right angled.

A parallelogram with sides of equal length (equilateral) is a rhombus but not a rhomboid.

A parallelogram with right angled corners is a rectangle but not a rhomboid.

The term rhomboid is now more often used for a rhombohedron or a more general parallelepiped, a solid figure with six faces in which each face is a parallelogram and pairs of opposite faces lie in parallel planes. Some crystals are formed in three-dimensional rhomboids. This solid is also sometimes called a rhombic prism. The term occurs frequently in science terminology referring to both its two- and three-dimensional meaning.

History
Euclid introduced the term in his Elements in Book I, Definition 22,

Euclid never used the definition of rhomboid again and introduced the word parallelogram in Proposition 34 of Book I; "In parallelogrammic areas the opposite sides and angles are equal to one another, and the diameter bisects the areas." Heath suggests that rhomboid was an older term already in use.

Symmetries
The rhomboid has no line of symmetry, but it has rotational symmetry of order 2.

In biology
In biology, rhomboid may describe a geometric rhomboid (e.g. the rhomboid muscles) or a bilaterally-symmetrical kite-shaped or diamond-shaped outline, as in leaves or cephalopod fins.

In medicine
In a type of arthritis called pseudogout, crystals of calcium pyrophosphate dihydrate accumulate in the joint, causing inflammation. Aspiration of the joint fluid reveals rhomboid-shaped crystals under a microscope.

References

External links

Types of quadrilaterals